Helen Jeanette Donath (née Erwin; born July 10, 1940) is an American soprano with a career spanning fifty years.

Biography
She was born in Corpus Christi, Texas and studied there at Del Mar College. Later she studied in New York with Paola Novikova. She debuted as a concert and Lieder singer in New York in 1958. She sang from 1963 until 1968 at the Staatsoper Hannover where she met her future husband, choir master and conductor Klaus Donath. Their son, Alexander Donath, is a stage and opera director. In 2000, all three were involved in Michigan Opera Theatre's production of Der Rosenkavalier where Donath sang the Marschallin.

In 1967, she sang Pamina in Mozart's The Magic Flute at the Salzburg Festival, which began a long association with the festival. From 1970 until 1990, she was a regular member of the Vienna State Opera. She has performed all over the world including at the Vienna State Opera, Metropolitan Opera, Salzburg Festival, Covent Garden, La Scala, Barcelona, Paris, Florence, Tokyo, Berlin, Munich. In 2006, she had performances as Despina in Così fan tutte at the Vienna State Opera, Salzburg Festival and other places.

Donath performed works of Bach, Mozart, Haydn, Schumann, Wagner, Richard Strauss, and has worked and recorded under Herbert von Karajan, Karl Richter, Wolfgang Sawallisch, Rafael Kubelík, Antal Doráti, Leonard Bernstein, Georg Solti, Giuseppe Patanè, Daniel Barenboim, Nikolaus Harnoncourt, Neville Marriner, Helmuth Rilling, Colin Davis, Eugen Jochum, Riccardo Muti, Zubin Mehta, Eliahu Inbal. She was awarded in 2005 the Verdienstkreuz I. Klasse des Niedersächsischen Verdienstordens (Cross of Merit 1st Class of Lower Saxony), in 1990 the Niedersachsenpreis and made Kammersängerin of Bavaria. She is Doctor honoris causa of the University of Miami.

Recordings
Donath has made many opera and operetta recordings with various companies. Her finest moments on disc include her Eva in Wagner's Die Meistersinger von Nürnberg and Sophie in Strauss's Der Rosenkavalier.
Beethoven: Fidelio (as Marzelline), with Helga Dernesch, Jon Vickers, Zoltán Kelemen, Karl Ridderbusch, José van Dam, Chorus of the Deutsche Oper, Berlin and Berliner Philharmoniker, (con.) Herbert von Karajan (EMI)
Gluck: Orfeo ed Euridice (as Amor), with Marilyn Horne, Pilar Lorengar, and Royal Opera House Orchestra, (con.) Sir Georg Solti (Decca)
Puccini: Gianni Schicchi (as Lauretta), with Rolando Panerai, Vera Baniewicz, Peter Seiffert, Munich Radio Symphony Orchestra, and Bavarian Radio Chorus, (con.) Giuseppe Patanè (RCA)
Lehár: The Land of Smiles (as Lisa), with Martin Finke, Klaus Hirte, Siegfried Jerusalem, Brigitte Lindner, Chor des Bayerischen Rundfunks, and Münchner Rundfunkorchester, (con.) Willi Boskovsky (EMI)
Strauss, R: Arabella (as Zdenka), with Júlia Várady, Dietrich Fischer-Dieskau, Walter Berry, Helga Schmidt, Elfriede Hobarth, Adolf Dallapozza, and Bavarian State Orchestra and Opera Chorus, (con.) Wolfgang Sawallisch (Orfeo)
Strauss, R: Der Rosenkavalier (as Sophie), with Régine Crespin, Yvonne Minton, Manfred Jungwirth, Vienna Philharmonic Orchestra, and Sir Georg Solti (Decca)
Verdi: Un ballo in maschera (as Oscar), with Luciano Pavarotti, Sherrill Milnes, Renata Tebaldi, Regina Resnik, and Orchestra dell'Accademia Nazionale di Santa Cecilia, (con.) Bruno Bartoletti (Decca)
Mozart: The Magic Flute (as Pamina), with Günther Leib, Peter Schreier, Leipzig Radio Chorus Orchestra, Staatskapelle Dresden Orchestra (RCA)
Monteverdi: L'incoronazione di Poppea (as Poppea), with Elisabeth Söderström, Cathy Berberian, Paul Esswood, and Concentus Musicus Wien, (con.) Nikolaus Harnoncourt (Teldec)
Wagner: Die Meistersinger von Nürnberg (as Eva), with René Kollo, Theo Adam, Peter Schreier, Geraint Evans, Karl Ridderbusch, Chor der Staatsoper Dresden, Chor des Leipziger Rundfunks and Staatskapelle Dresden, (con.) Herbert von Karajan (EMI)
Haydn: L'anima del filosofo, with Robert Swensen, Sylvia Greenberg, Thomas Quasthoff, Paul Hansen, Azuko Suzuki, Bavarian Radio Chorus and Munich Radio Orchestra, (con.) Leopold Hager (Orfeo)
Humperdinck: Hänsel und Gretel, with Anna Moffo, Christa Ludwig, Dietrich Fischer-Dieskau, Charlotte Berthold, Arleen Auger, Lucia Popp, the Münchner Rundfunkorchester, Tölzer Knabenchor, and Kurt Eichhorn as conductor. RCA 1999
Hindemith Sancta Susanna, as Susanna with Gabriele Schnaut (Klementia) and Gabriele Schreckenbach (Alte Nonne), Janis Martin, Damen des RIAS Kammerchors, Radio-Symphonie-Orchester Berlin, Gerd Albrecht, conductor

Other recordings

 Bach: Christmas Oratorio / Schreier
 Bach: Cantatas BWV 41 / Rilling
 Bach: Cantatas BWV 119–121 / Rilling
 Bach: Easter Cantatas / Rilling
 Bach: Magnificat / Gönnenwein
 Bach: St Matthew Passion / K. Richter (DVD)
 Bach: St John Passion / K. Richter (DVD)
 Beethoven: Fidelio / Leonard Bernstein
 Beethoven: Missa solemnis / Kubelik
 Beethoven: Symphony No. 9 / Celibidache
 Beethoven: Symphony No 9 / Kubelik
 Blendinger: Media in Vita, Sawallisch, with Hermann Becht, Bayerisches Staatsorchester
 Bizet: Carmen / Lorin Maazel
 Debussy: Pelléas et Mélisande / Kubelik
 Flotow: Alessandro Stradella/ Wallberg, Schartner
 Gluck: Orfeo ed Euridice / Solti
 Handel: Messiah / K. Richter
 Haydn: La vera costanza / Doráti
 Haydn: The Creation, The Seasons / Koch
 Humperdinck: Königskinder / Wallberg
 Lehár: The Merry Widow (as Valencienne), with Bavarian Radio Chorus and Munich Radio Orchestra, Heinz Wallberg conducting (EMI)
 Mahler: Symphony No. 4 / Inbal
 Mozart: Così fan tutte / Honeck (DVD)
 Mozart: Great Mass in C minor, Mass in C major, Requiem / C. Davis
 Mozart: The Magic Flute / Suitner
 Mozart: Don Giovanni / Barenboim
 Mozart: La finta semplice / Hager
 Mozart: The Marriage of Figaro / C. Davis
 Mozart: Lucio Silla / Hager
 Mozart: Unknown Arias for Soprano / Donath
 Nicolai: The Merry Wives of Windsor / Klee
 Pfitzner: Das Christ-Elflein / Eichhorn
 Pfitzner: Palestrina / Kubelik
 Schubert: Sacred Works / Sawallisch
 Schubert: "The Shepherd on the Rock" / Donath
 Schubert: Masses, etc. / Sawallisch
 Schubert: Cantata Lazarus with Wolfgang Sawallisch, Bavarian Radio Orchestra
 Schumann: Requiem, etc. / Klee,
 Schumann: Der Rose Pilgerfahrt, Op. 112, Sawallisch
 Wagner: Der Ring des Nibelungen / Karajan, Berlin
 Weber: Der Freischütz / Sawallisch

See also
 Marilyn Horne: Divas in Song

References

External links
Biography and photos, bach-cantatas.com
Biography, classicalarchives.com

Interview with Helen Donath, June 18, 1992

1940 births
Living people
American operatic sopranos
People from Corpus Christi, Texas
Singers from Texas
Classical musicians from Texas
21st-century American women